The Nobel Prize is an annual, international prize first awarded in 1901 for achievements in Physics, Chemistry, Physiology or Medicine, Literature, and Peace, with an associated prize in Economics awarded since 1969. As of November 2022, Nobel Prizes had been awarded to 954 individuals, of whom 17 were Black recipients (1.7% of the 954 individual recipients).

Black people have received awards in three of the six award categories: twelve in Peace (70.6% of the black recipients), four in Literature (23.5%), and one in Economics (5.9%). The first Black recipient, Ralph Bunche, was awarded the Peace Prize in 1950. The most recent, Abdulrazak Gurnah, was awarded the Prize in Literature in 2021.

Among the Black laureates, three served as heads of state or government of their respective countries upon receiving the Nobel Prize, while one was awarded before taking office. Those include Barack Obama of the United States and Ellen Johnson Sirleaf of Liberia, who were presidents, along with Abiy Ahmed of Ethiopia, who was prime minister; all of them were awarded the Peace Prize. In addition, Nelson Mandela of South Africa became a Nobel Peace laureate before being elected president.

Economics
One Black person has been awarded the Nobel Prize in Economics.

Literature
Four Black people have been given the Nobel Prize in Literature.

Peace
12 Black people have been given the Nobel Peace Prize.

See also 
 List of Nobel laureates
 List of African Nobel laureates
 List of Latino and Hispanic Nobel laureates
 List of Christian Nobel laureates
 List of Muslim Nobel laureates
 List of Jewish Nobel laureates

References

External links 
 Nelson Mandela Interview

Nobel Laureates
Black